State Road 178 (AR 178, Ark. 178, and Hwy. 178) is a former state highway in Baxter County, Arkansas. It was maintained by the Arkansas Highway Department, now known as the Arkansas Department of Transportation (ArDOT).

Major intersections

History
The highway first appeared on the 1945 state highway map, though did not appear on the prior map in 1941. Maps were not created in the interim during World War II. The road had been replaced by a rerouted State Road 5 on the March 1953 map.

See also

 List of state highways in Arkansas

References

178 1945
Transportation in Baxter County, Arkansas